Laura Petruța Popa (born 29 June 1994) is a Romanian handballer who plays as a right back for Rapid București and the Romanian national team.

International honours 
Youth World Championship:
Fourth place: 2012
World University Championship: 
Silver Medalist: 2016

References

External links

1994 births
Living people
Sportspeople from Slatina, Romania
Romanian female handball players
Expatriate handball players
Romanian expatriate sportspeople in Hungary